The Supreme Military Council (YAŞ) is a committee in the Turkish Armed Forces. It convenes annually to determine the military's agenda. It was restructured in 2018.

It is formed under the chairpersonship of the President, Vice President, Ministers of Justice, Interior, Foreign Affair, Treasury and Finance, National Education, National Defense, Chief of General Staff, commanders of the Army, Navy and Air Force. The Secretary General of the Council is the Minister of National Defense.

Generally, council meetings are held in the first week of August and expands into three days. The appointments are made to be effective by 30 August (Victory Day). However, due to failed 15 July coup, the 2016 council meeting was held on 28 July 2016 and completed in a single day.

Council members

See also
National Security Council
National security

References 

Military of Turkey